Laffey is the surname of:

 Aaron Laffey (born 1985), American Major League Baseball pitcher
 Bartlett Laffey (1841–1901), Irish-born United States Navy sailor and Medal of Honor recipient
 Bernie Laffey (born 1928), former Australian rules footballer
 Marcus Laffey, pen name of The New Yorker columnist and author Edward Conlon (born 1965)
 Merv Laffey (1925–2007), Australian rules footballer
 Michael Laffey (1863–?), American politician
 Steve Laffey (born 1962), American politician, businessman, author and filmmaker
 Thomas J. Laffey (born 1943), Irish mathematician
 Tony Laffey, footballer who represented New Zealand in 1958

See also
 Laffy, another surname